Marc Naiken is a member of the National Assembly of Seychelles.  He is a member of the Seychelles People's Progressive Front, and was first elected to the Assembly in 2007.

See also
 Index of Seychelles-related articles
 Outline of Seychelles
 Politics of Seychelles

References

External links
Member page on Assembly website

Year of birth missing (living people)
Living people
Members of the National Assembly (Seychelles)
People from Au Cap
United Seychelles Party politicians